Amoeboceras is an extinct genus of ammonite cephalopod closely related to the genus Cardioceras. Fossils are found in Late Jurassic-aged marine strata of Europe and Russia.

References

Jurassic ammonites
Ammonitida genera
Stephanoceratoidea